Johannes Maremane (born 27 September 1965) is a South African long-distance runner. He competed in the men's marathon at the 2000 Summer Olympics.

References

1965 births
Living people
Athletes (track and field) at the 2000 Summer Olympics
South African male long-distance runners
South African male marathon runners
Olympic athletes of South Africa
People from Polokwane
Sportspeople from Limpopo